Maine Tide is an American women's soccer team, founded in 2007. The team is a member of the Women's Premier Soccer League, the third tier of women's soccer in the United States and Canada. The team plays in the North Division of the East Conference.

The team plays their home games at John Boucher Soccer Field on the campus of Husson College in Bangor, Maine. The team's colors are sky blue, white and gold.

The team is a sister organization of the men's Maine Sting team, which plays in the National Premier Soccer League.

Players

Current roster

Notable former players

Year-by-year

Honors

Competition History

Coaches
  Seth Brown 2008–present

Stadia
 John Boucher Soccer Field, Portland, Maine 2008–present

Average Attendance

References

External links
 Official Site
 WPSL Maine Tide page
CTEcreative Logo Design

Soccer clubs in Maine
Women's Premier Soccer League teams
Women's soccer clubs in the United States
Sports in Bangor, Maine
2007 establishments in Maine
Association football clubs established in 2007